2022 Southeast Maluku riot namely riots that occurred on 6 October and 12 November 2022 in Southeast Maluku Regency, Maluku. This riot involved three villages (Kei: ohoi) in Kei Besar District, namely the villages of Bombai and Ngurdu with the Elat village.

Background
The clashes between residents of the two villages were allegedly triggered by traditional activities carried out by residents of Bombai village. That is in the form of installing customary prohibition or sasi adat on the border of the two villages. This sparked the anger of the villagers of Elat, resulting in attacks against each other.

Elat village itself is one of two villages inhabited by Bandanese Muslims, in addition to the Eli village. The Banda people migrated to Kei Islands from Banda Islands due to Banda Massacre in 1609–1621 perpetrated by VOC. While the villages of Bombai and Ngurdu are inhabited by the Kei Catholics who are the original inhabitants of the Kei Islands.

In addition to problems at the border of the two villages, the dispute between the two villages is also suspected to be due to ethnic and religious sentiments between the two villages, but the Regent of Southeast Maluku M. Thaher Hanubun denied it and stated that the rioting was not a religious conflict. In fact, these clashes had happened before. Even the conflict that occurred, on November 12, 2022, was the impact of previous events. On Sunday, on October 6, 2022, there was also a conflict between the two villages. However, the police immediately took security measures.

The news that the clash between the residents of Bombai and Elat was caused by a dispute over land boundaries was denied by a figure from the Wandan Student Youth Association Yunus Rahawarin, According to him, the trigger for the clash was a fight between students at SMA Negeri Elat on October 6, 2022. According to him, the land boundary issue has been resolved long ago and there is no problem regarding the land to be installed sasi. Even according to Yunus, the only one who has the right to speak about the land in Elat is he and families. This is because the land was a gift from King Yamtel, the head of Mel Rahawarin.

Riot
This riot started with clashes between the three villagers which have been going on since Saturday morning (12/11/2022) at 08.00 WIT (UTC +9). The clashes started when residents of the villages of Bombai and Ngurdu forced them to install sasi adat or customary prohibitions on the border of the Elat village. Residents of the three villages claim the land on the border as their land. Residents of the Elat village who did not accept the installation of sasi adat then put up a fight until finally there was a clash. The weapons used in this clash are machete, arrow, bamboo, dan firearms.

Aftermath
As a result of this riot, two civilians died due to the riots and two members of the Indonesian National Police consisting of members of Brimob and Polresta Tual injured by being stabbed arrow. In addition to injuring two police officers, 42 people consisting of civilians and police also suffered injuries due to the clashes that occurred. 26 residents houses and two school buildings were also burned due to this riot.

See also
2022 Haruku Island riot
Maluku sectarian conflict

References

Riots and civil disorder in Indonesia
Kai Islands
2022 in Indonesia